Roy Shepherd (born ) is a former British ice hockey player. He played between 1951 and 1978 for the Wembley Lions, Southampton Vikings and Brighton Tigers. He also played for the Great Britain national ice hockey team between 1951 and 1962. He was inducted to the British Ice Hockey Hall of Fame in 1999.

External links

British Ice Hockey Hall of Fame entry

1931 births
Brighton Tigers players
British Ice Hockey Hall of Fame inductees
Living people
Wembley Lions players
English ice hockey defencemen